The National Biodiversity Pavillion (in spanish Pabellón Nacional de la Biodiversidad of the National Autonomous University of Mexico) is a Mexico's museum oriented towards showing the national biodiversity in Mexico. It was opened in 2021 at the Ciudad Universitaria in Mexico City. 

It is located alongside multiple museums and concerts halls in the Centro Cultural Universitario

Institution
Opened in 2021, with the sponsorship of Carlos Slim, the museum hosts a number of permanent exhibits which consist mostly on samples of local flora and fauna from Mexico.

It has 12,000 square meters of construction, and the whole design is a combination of architectural designs inspired by biology and elements of nature.

Services and events

It currently has many courses to teach youngsters and elders on how to program and develop digital proficiencies.

References

Science museums in Mexico
Museums in Mexico City
National Autonomous University of Mexico